Bharat Ratna Dr. M.G.R. Central Bus Stand, commonly known as Salem Central Bus Stand, is one of the bus terminus of Salem other being the Town Bus Terminus Salem City.

Overview 

Being a major transit point in the central region of the state and spreading over an area of  this terminus is managed by Department of Transport (Tamil Nadu), experiences a heavy traffic of operating about 1,100 buses operating and crossing through the bus terminus. It is located in Center of the Salem City. It has been renamed by Government of Tamil Nadu as Bharat Ratna Dr. M.G.R. Central Bus Stand to honor the AIADMK founder and the former Chief Minister of Tamil Nadu M. G. Ramachandran.This project was built on contract basis done by Sri chakra construction owned by Er.A.K.Chakrapani

Renovation 

The Salem Municipal Corporation had decided to Lay concrete flooring on the entire new bus stand premises at an outlay of Rs. 5 crores. This would enable in keeping the bus stand neat and tidy and also prevent waterlogging during the monsoon period. The project has been undertaken under the Infrastructure Gap Filling Fund.

Routes

Connections 

See also 
 Town Bus Terminus Salem
 Salem Junction
 Salem City Municipal Corporation
 Edappadi
 Yercaud

References 
3.  Engineer Attur krishnasamy chakrapani.jpg

External links 
 salem City Municipal Corporation
 TNSTC Online Ticket Booking
 KSRTC Online Ticket Booking

Bus stations in Salem, Tamil Nadu
Transport in Salem, Tamil Nadu